State Route 332 (SR 332) is a north–south state highway in the eastern portion of the U.S. state of Ohio. Its northern terminus is in downtown Carrollton at its junction with the triplex of State Route 9, State Route 39 and State Route 43.

Route description
Along its way, State Route 332 passes through portions of Harrison and Carroll Counties.  This state route is not included as a part of the National Highway System, a network of highways deemed most important for the economy, mobility and defense of the nation.

History
State Route 332 first appeared in 1933, routed along the alignment that it maintains to this day through northern Harrison County and southern Carroll County.  No changes of major significance have taken place to the highway since its designation.

Major intersections

References

External links

332
Transportation in Carroll County, Ohio
Transportation in Harrison County, Ohio